Breyer Mesa is an ice-covered mesa,  long and rising over , standing between Christy Glacier and Tate Glacier on the west side of Amundsen Glacier, in the Queen Maud Mountains. It was discovered by R. Admiral Byrd on the South Pole flight of November 1929, and named by him for Robert S. Breyer, West Coast representative and patron of the Byrd Antarctic Expedition, 1928–30. The name "Mount Breyer" was previously recommended for this feature, but the Advisory Committee on Antarctic Names has amended the terminology to the more suitable Breyer Mesa.

References 

Mesas of Antarctica
Landforms of the Ross Dependency
Amundsen Coast